Travis Taylor may refer to:

 Travis Taylor (American football) (born 1978), American football player
 Travis S. Taylor, American science fiction author, scientist, and host of Rocket City Rednecks television show
 Travis Taylor (basketball), American basketball player
 Travis Taylor (rugby union) (born 1995), New Zealand rugby union player